Loved Me Back to Life is the eleventh English-language and twenty-fifth studio album by Canadian singer Celine Dion, released by Sony Music Entertainment on 1 November 2013. It was preceded by the lead single and title track, "Loved Me Back to Life", which was released on 3 September 2013. Loved Me Back to Life is Dion's first English-language studio album since Taking Chances (2007). It was produced by Emanuel Kiriakou, Babyface, Tricky Stewart, Aaron Pearce, Kuk Harrell, Eg White, Play Production, Ne-Yo and Walter Afanasieff among others. The album includes two duets: "Incredible" with Ne-Yo and "Overjoyed" with Stevie Wonder. Loved Me Back to Life garnered positive reviews from music critics and has sold over 1.5 million copies worldwide.

Background
In June 2012, Dion's official website announced that during April and May, the singer began recording songs for her next English and French albums which were to be released in the fall of 2012. The English album was to feature studio versions of previously unreleased songs from Dion's Las Vegas show, Celine, as well as several brand new tracks.  In August 2012, celinedion.com confirmed that a cover of Journey's "Open Arms", which opens Dion's Las Vegas show, will be included on the upcoming English-language album. In September 2012, it was also revealed that "Ne me quitte pas" will appear on the English album. Eventually, "Ne me quitte pas" was released on the deluxe edition of Sans attendre and "Open Arms" was included on the Japanese edition of the English album only. Le Journal de Montréal stated that the English album will also contain some songs written by Eg White, who worked with Adele on 19 and 21, some tracks produced by Babyface and a duet with Stevie Wonder on "Overjoyed" which Dion performs during her Las Vegas show. In March 2013, Ne-Yo confirmed information which first appeared on Dion's official website in September 2012, that both singers recorded a duet. Ne-Yo said that it was a challenge and it made him question his vocal ability. The duo first worked together on 2007's Taking Chances, with Ne-Yo co-writing and co-producing "I Got Nothin' Left". Another new track written by Diane Warren, "Unfinished Songs" was included in the British-German film Song for Marion. However, when the soundtrack for the movie was released in February 2013, it did not feature Dion's song which was saved for her upcoming album. The recording session for "Unfinished Songs" was posted on Dion's website in July 2013.

On 14 September 2012, celinedion.com announced that Dion's new English album titled Water and a Flame will be released in November 2012. However, on 26 September 2012, Sony Music Entertainment decided to postpone the release date of the new English-language album to 2013. In March 2013, René Angélil explained that they decided to delay the release date because the concept of the album has changed. Instead of only half of the disc with original songs, they decided that the majority of the album should be original songs. Angélil stated that initially, the album was supposed to have six covers and six original songs. After further discussion, they decided to put two covers from Dion's Las Vegas show: "At Seventeen" and "Overjoyed". The behind-the-scenes look at Dion recording "At Seventeen", with Babyface producing it, was posted on her website in April 2013. "Overjoyed", with new arrangement by Stevie Wonder, was co-produced by Tricky Stewart. In April 2013, celinedion.com presented a behind-the-scenes look at Dion and producer Eg White recording the song "Water and a Flame". The rest of the album was to contain original songs, including two co-written by Audra Mae, the great-great-niece of Judy Garland. The album was scheduled for release in October 2013. In July 2013, it was announced that it will be titled Loved Me Back to Life. Dion performed the title song live for the very first time during Céline... une seule fois concert in Quebec City on 27 July 2013 and two days later her website announced that the album will be released in November 2013.

Content
On 29 August 2013, Billboard exclusively announced that the new album, Loved Me Back to Life will be issued in North America on 5 November 2013 and that the lead single, "Loved Me Back to Life" will be released on 3 September 2013. Billboard wrote that the album will be Dion's "edgiest record to date -- just not in the ways you might think". For example, "Water and a Flame", originally recorded by Daniel Merriweather and Adele, finds Dion utilizing the lower, grainier register of her voice. "Even more unexpected" is the lead single, "Loved Me Back to Life", the album's title track penned by Sia and produced by Sham and Motesart. Sung in a minor key, the song is "a different kind of power ballad for Dion, backed by a chorus that features a beat drop that could almost be described as dubstep". The new album also features a pair of tracks written by Ne-Yo, including the duet "Incredible", which sounds "so massive the Olympic Committee should start bookmarking it for the 2014 Winter Games". There's also collaborations with Babyface, Tricky Stewart, and Swedish trio Play Production, the latter of whom produced the beat-driven "Somebody Loves Somebody", penned by Audra Mae (who also wrote songs for Avicii's album True). Loved Me Back to Life also features two covers from Dion's Las Vegas show Celine – Janis Ian's "At Seventeen", and a "reverent" take on "Overjoyed", which doubles as a duet with Stevie Wonder himself. However, the deluxe edition includes two more songs which Dion performs in Las Vegas, "How Do You Keep the Music Playing?" and "Lullaby (Goodnight, My Angel)", plus four collector postcards. Loved Me Back to Life also features "Unfinished Songs" written by Diane Warren for the British-German film Song for Marion. The album was also released on a vinyl LP and includes "Save Your Soul" with rap interlude by Malcolm David Kelley from MKTO. This two disc 180 gram vinyl includes an eight-page booklet featuring exclusive photos and imagery, and also a CD of the full album. "Open Arms", which is included on the Japanese edition only, was produced by Fraser T Smith, who also co-wrote and produced "Set Fire to the Rain" by Adele.  The album also contains "Breakaway" written by Audra Mae, Johan Fransson, Tim Larsson, and Tobias Lundgre, and previously recorded by German singer Ivy Quainoo for her 2012 album Ivy. On 29 October 2013, Billboard published another article stating that "Always Be Your Girl" was the first original song found for the album. It was written by Dana Parish and Andrew Hollander after watching Dion's 2011 documentary, 3 Boys and a New Show on OWN. Dion claims to hold a special connection to the song as she thinks of her sons when she hears the lyrics.

Singles
The first single, "Loved Me Back to Life" was released on 3 September 2013. In the United States, it debuted at number twenty-six on the Billboard'''s Adult Contemporary becoming Dion's fortieth entry on this chart. "Loved Me Back to Life" peaked on the AC chart in the third week, reaching number twenty-four. The song has sold 23,000 downloads in the first week enabling its debut on Pop Digital Songs at number nineteen and on Hot Digital Songs at number sixty-three. It also reached number three on the Hot Dance Club Songs. In Canada, "Loved Me Back to Life" landed the Hot Shot Debut on the Canadian Hot 100, coming in at number twenty-six. It became Dion's best debut to date on the chart and her second best peak on the list, only behind 2007's "Taking Chances". In the United Kingdom, "Loved Me Back to Life" reached number fourteen becoming Dion's highest charting single since "A New Day Has Come" got to number seven in 2002. 
 
"Breakaway" was released as a second but promotional only single in the United Kingdom on 5 December 2013 and in France on 22 January 2014. On 14 February 2014, "Incredible" (duet with Ne-Yo) was digitally released as the second single in most European countries (except France and the United Kingdom), in Australia and New Zealand. The song was also sent to Adult Contemporary radio stations in the United States on 24 February 2014 where it reached number twenty-five. On the Canadian Hot 100 "Incredible" peaked at number forty-four. 
The music video for "Incredible" premiered on 4 June 2014. Although set for the commercial release in the UK on 24 March 2014, "Water and a Flame" became the third but radio-only single there.

Promotion
After a little promotion of the first single "Loved Me Back to Life" in the United States in September 2013, another new track, "Somebody Loves Somebody" premiered on 17 October 2013. The official audio of "Somebody Loves Somebody" was released onto Dion's Vevo channel on 22 October 2013. On 29 October 2013, the official audio of "Incredible" (duet with Ne-Yo) was released as well. On 5 November 2013, two more tracks were uploaded on Vevo: "Water and a Flame" and "At Seventeen". And on 3 December 2013, the audio of "Breakaway" was added as well. A few videos of making the songs were also posted on Vevo.

Dion started promoting her album in the United States. On 28 October 2013, she performed "Somebody Loves Somebody" and "Water and a Flame" on The Today Show and "Loved Me Back to Life" on Late Night with Jimmy Fallon. She performed "Loved Me Back to Life" on The View on 30 October 2013. Additionally, Dion gave an intimate club performance at the Edison Ballroom in New York City on 29 October 2013 which was broadcast on 1 November 2013 on QVC. She performed her old hits and few new songs, including "Loved Me Back to Life", "Water and a Flame" and "At Seventeen", and the concert received great reviews. On 6 November 2013, Dion performed "Somebody Loves Somebody" on The Dr. Oz Show. In Canada, she sang "Loved Me Back to Life" and "Incredible" with Ne-Yo on Le Banquier on 3 November 2013.

In Europe, Dion performed "Loved Me Back to Life" on Wetten, dass..? in Germany on 9 November 2013 and The X Factor in the United Kingdom on 10 November 2013. She also recorded a performance of "Breakaway" for another UK show, Strictly Come Dancing which was broadcast on 15 December 2013. Dion also performed "Loved Me Back to Life", "At Seventeen" and her older hits on C'est votre vie in France on 16 November 2013. She also sang "Loved Me Back to Life" and "Water and a Flame" during her Sans attendre Tour which started in Belgium on 21 November 2013. Later in France, Dion performed "Loved Me Back to Life" on Les chansons d'abord on 1 December 2013, Vivement Dimanche on 8 December 2013, Les disques d'Or on 18 December 2013 and Ce soir on chante on 3 January 2014. Additionally her concert, Céline... une seule fois was broadcast on three European channels: RTS Deux in Switzerland on 24 December 2013, D8 in France on 25 December 2013 and La Une in Belgium on 31 December 2013.

Dion returned to the United States in mid-December 2013 and performed "Incredible" with Ne-Yo during the grand finale of The Voice on 17 December 2013. The next day, she sang "Loved Me Back to Life", "Incredible" with Ne-Yo and "Didn't Know Love" during the CBS 15th annual A Home for the Holidays television special that celebrates the joy of adoption by sharing stories of adoption from foster care in order to raise awareness for the cause. On 30 December 2013, Dion returned to performing her show Celine in Las Vegas and recorded "Loved Me Back to Life" especially for the Canadian Global Television Network as part of the ET Canadas New Year's Eve at Niagara Falls. On 31 December 2013, Ne-Yo surprised Dion when he showed up to perform "Incredible" at the New Year's Eve performance of Celine in Las Vegas.

Critical reception

Loved Me Back to Life garnered positive reviews from music critics. According to the music review aggregator Metacritic, it has received a score of 65/100, indicating generally favorable reviews. AllMusic gave the album three and a half (out of five) stars, and called it "a record that flirts with new ideas but never hooks up. Yet, that flirtation counts for something: it means the album is livelier, less self-conscious, less beholden to the expected, and quick-footed enough to not seem mired in show biz glitz". The review by Stephen Thomas Erlewine noted that "there's nothing here that screams big hit –- but it's something better: the work of a diva who is comfortable in her own skin". In a positive review, The New York Times critic Jon Caramanica first noted Dion's usual musical inclinations towards melodrama and bombast, noting that "She is the iceberg, destroying all Titanics". However, he then commended Dion's attempt to evolve, commenting "that she'd bother to innovate at all on the strong Loved Me Back to Life, her first English-language album in six years, is worthy in and of itself. Compared with her usual motor-powered balladry, this album is positively peppy. You can just register the faint outline of contemporary R&B and even hip-hop, thanks to a pair of productions by Tricky Stewart. On the vinyl version of the track "Save Your Soul", there's a rap interlude by Malcolm David Kelley, late of Lost and now of the pop-hip-hop duo MKTO. There's also an implicit embrace of current dance-pop on the title track, which was written in part by Sia, the Australian singer and songwriter whose "Titanium" (made with the producer David Guetta) was one of last year's most vocally ambitious dance-diva hits". Caramanica also complimented Dion's improved delivery: "On this album she's singing with more rhythm, if not more clarity, than usual". Unusually favorable review came from Rolling Stone (by editor Dave Dimartino from Yahoo! Music): "new Celine album is a damned fine, polished thing, exactly what you'd want to release when you're renowned as the highest-grossing touring artist in the world from 2000 to 2010, and a solid listen through and through!"

Elysa Gardner of USA Today gave the album three out of four stars, acknowledging Dion's use of "softer, grittier vocals and more nuanced drama than previous power ballads". Gardner also noted: "A subtler, more subdued Celine Dion may be interesting in theory, but bright shades still suit this diva best". The Oakland Press critic Gary Graff awarded the album three out of four stars, stating that the disc "finds Dion creatively frisky and exploring new sonic environments for the muscular voice that helped sink the Titanic, at least on film — with help from producers such as Hasham Hussain, Emanuel Kiriakou and the Swedish team Play Production. The more contemporary approach is evident from the get-go on the Sia Fuller co-written title track, with its stuttering vocal hook and dubstep-style beats, which wouldn't sound out of place on, say, a Rihanna album". Graff concluded: "It's not a wholesale reinvention, but Loved Me Back to Life will make fans look at Dion a little differently, and might even bring some new folks in from the sidelines".

Slant Magazine gave Loved Me Back to Life a more mixed review. Despite allowing the overall album a seemingly positive score of three out of five, critic Eric Henderson found the shift to more contemporary material unconvincing, noting that "If Chaka Khan was every woman, Dion is and ever shall be every awkward soccer mom. Only now, she's taken her CD-R of Celtic pop tunes out of the SUV stereo and is bumping a mix of midtempo neo-power ballads from the likes of Kesha and Katy Perry instead. Typical of mothers struggling to fit in with the next generation, the chief intention of Loved Me Back to Life is to pass for contemporary". On a positive note, Henderson opined that the album works when Dion sticks to her established signature style: "Dion's cover of Janis Ian's rueful "At Seventeen" comes off less like a lament for childhood dreams that didn't come to pass and more like a lilting word of advice from someone old enough to know better, which is precisely the zone where the album excels: when Dion drops the act and embraces her manic, Hallmark card-brandishing guru of schmaltz". Steve Morse of The Boston Globe dismissed the album as "littered with syrupy, easy-listening, trite-lyric ballads that undersell her talent". Similar to Slant Magazine critic Eric Henderson's review, Morse maintained that Dion is at her best when she reverts to her old formula, stating: "She experiments at times with a more gravelly voice, suggesting a bid for more street appeal, but the overall effect is stiff and mechanical, minus the warmth for which she is known". RenownedForSound.com praised the album, giving the collection a four star review saying "It goes to show that Celine Dion has released something delightful for old and new fans, with a mixture of songs that have both a Pop/RnB focus as well as encompassing her adult contemporary-pop roots".

Commercial performance
Loved Me Back To Life debuted within the top ten in at least 20 countries around the world. 
Canada
In Dion's native Canada, Loved Me Back to Life debuted at number one with 106,000 units sold. It became her thirteenth number-one album in the SoundScan era and eleventh to debut at the top of the chart. Loved Me Back to Life marked the best one week sales total for any release in Canada since 2008, when AC/DC's Black Ice sold 119,000 units. It also became Dion's best one week sales total since she sold 152,000 copies in the first week of release of 2002's A New Day Has Come. In its second week, the album remained at number one, selling 31,000 units. After just these two weeks of sales, Loved Me Back to Life was placed at number nine on the Billboard Year-End chart of Top Canadian Albums. For the next three weeks, it occupied the number two position on the Canadian Albums Chart selling 15,000, 19,000 and again 19,000 copies. Later, Loved Me Back to Life fell to number six with sales of 13,000 units and in the seventh week it rose to number four selling another 19,000 copies. In the last week of 2013, the album fell to number six with sales of 10,000 units, bringing the total sales to 231,000 copies. It became the second best-selling album in Canada in 2013 after Eminem's The Marshall Mathers LP 2 which sold 242,000 units. In December 2013, Dion's album was certified four-times Platinum by Music Canada for shipping 320,000 copies.

United States
In the United States, Loved Me Back To Life debuted at number two with 77,000 copies sold in its first week and became Dion's highest charting album since One Heart also bowed at number two in 2003. In the next two weeks, Loved Me Back to Life fell to number thirteen and twenty-six, selling 25,000 and 13,000 units. In the fourth week, the album moved up one spot to number twenty-five selling 30,000 copies (up 132%). Later, it dropped to number thirty-five with sales of 16,000 units and number thirty-eight selling another 16,000 copies. On its seventh week, thanks to Dion's performance on the grand finale of The Voice and the CBS 15th annual A Home for the Holidays television special, the album went up to number twenty-six with 28,000 units sold (up 72%). In the final week of 2013, Loved Me Back to Life fell to number thirty-one selling 19,000 copies and bringing its total to 224,000 units sold. As of June 2014, it has sold 300,000 copies in the US.

United Kingdom
In the United Kingdom, Loved Me Back to Life debuted at number three with 53,000 copies sold, becoming Dion's highest charting album since 2002 chart-topper A New Day Has Come. On 22 November 2013, Loved Me Back to Life was certified Silver in the UK for selling over 60,000 copies. In the second week, it fell to number four selling 28,000 units and in the third week it slipped to number eight with sales of another 28,000 copies. After these three weeks, on 6 December 2013 the album was certified Gold in the UK for selling over 100,000 units. In the next two weeks, Loved Me Back to Life stayed at number eight selling 34,000 and 44,000 copies respectively. In the sixth week, after Dion's performance on Strictly Come Dancing, the album jumped to number seven selling 64,000 units (biggest weekly sales; up 45%). The next week, Loved Me Back to Life fell to number thirteen, selling 33,000 copies, bringing the total sales to 283,000 units. After these seven weeks in 2013, it reached number twenty-three on the UK Year-End Albums Chart. As of 2 February 2014, the album has sold over 300,000 copies and five days later it was certified Platinum in the UK. In total, it has sold 350,000 units in the UK (as of June 2014).

France
In France, Loved Me Back to Life entered the chart at number three selling 31,000 copies. In the next weeks, it occupied the following positions: number five (17,000 units sold), number six (19,000), number seven (17,000), number ten (20,000) and number eleven (24,000). In the seventh week, the album jumped to number ten with its biggest weekly sales of 34,000 copies (up 40%). In the last week of 2013, it rose to number nine selling 25,000 units and bringing total sales to 186,000 copies. On 18 December 2013, Loved Me Back to Life was certified two-times Platinum by SNEP for shipping 200,000 units. As of 1 June 2014, it has sold over 215,000 copies in France.

Rest of the world
The album proved similarly successful in other countries, peaking at number one in the Netherlands, number two in Belgium and Taiwan, number three in Switzerland, Ireland and South Africa, number four in Austria, Hungary and China, number seven in Norway, number eight in Czech Republic and South Korea, number nine in Germany, Australia and Croatia, and number ten in New Zealand. It also reached top twenty in Denmark, Italy, Poland, Spain, Portugal, Greece, Sweden, Croatia and Finland. Loved Me Back to Life was also certified Gold in Belgium, Switzerland, Poland, Hungary and South Africa, and has sold 1.5 million copies worldwide.

Accolades

Thanks to Loved Me Back to Life, Dion was nominated for four Juno Awards of 2014: Artist of the Year, Fan Choice Award, Album of the Year and Adult Contemporary Album of the Year. Dion was also nominated for six 2014 World Music Awards, including World's Best Female Artist, World's Best Album (Loved Me Back to Life) and World's Best Song ("Incredible"). She was nominated for two more Félix Awards in 2014 as well: Anglophone Album of the Year (Loved Me Back to Life) and Artist of the Year Achieving the Most Success Outside Quebec, but lost to Arcade Fire in both categories.

Controversy
Loved Me Back to Life was originally to be titled Water and a Flame, named after another track on the album, "Water and a Flame", written by Australian singer-songwriter Daniel Merriweather along with British musician Eg White, and first performed by Merriweather and Adele. In an April 2013 interview on The Katie Couric Show to promote the album, Dion played a recording of her cover of "Water and a Flame". Right before hearing the song, Katie Couric asked Dion and her husband/manager, René Angélil, in reference to the then title of the album: "where did 'Water and a Flame' come from?" Angélil responded, "It's, you know, the opposites". Dion replied, "It's the name of the song". Musician Samantha Ronson, who is a friend of Merriweather's, wrote a blog post that included the video of the interview and the text "Dear Celine Dion, when you cover someone else's song- you might want to give them credit". In June 2013, Merriweather linked to Ronson's post from his Facebook page and harshly criticized Dion, writing, "This song has every ounce of my heartache and pain in it and she pretends as if she wrote it herself". Two days later, Dion's management responded on her website, saying that, while Dion often does not mention the writers of her songs, "she has been very vocal about the fact that she does not write her own songs," that she did not intend any harm by the omission, and that all of the writers and producers were always credited in the liner notes. On 25 July 2013, her website confirmed that the album was re-titled to Loved Me Back to Life.

Track listingNotes'''
 signifies a vocal producer
 features rap by Malcolm Kelley on the vinyl edition of the album
 signifies an additional producer
 signifies a co-producer
 signifies remix and additional production

Charts

Weekly charts

Year-end charts

All-time charts

Certifications and sales

Release history

See also
2013 in British music charts
List of fastest-selling albums
List of number-one albums of 2013 (Canada)

References

External links

2013 albums
Albums produced by Eg White
Albums produced by Emanuel Kiriakou
Albums produced by Kuk Harrell
Albums produced by Ne-Yo
Albums produced by Tricky Stewart
Albums produced by Walter Afanasieff
Celine Dion albums
Columbia Records albums